is a shrine dedicated to the Shinto kami ('god') Inari. Its construction can be traced to 12 BCE, and Inari was enshrined there by Toyotomi Hideyoshi in the 1580s to protect Osaka Castle.

Location

The shrine is a short walk north from exit #1 of the Tamatsukuri Station on the Nagahori-tsurumi-ryokuchi Line of the Osaka subway system. It is close to the JR Loop Line.

The address is 2-3-8, Tamatsukuri, Chūō-ku, Osaka City, 540-0004.

References

External links

Website (Japanese): www.inari.or.jp

12 BC establishments
Shinto shrines in Osaka
Inari shrines